Kristin Pudenz (born 9 February 1993) is a German athlete specialising in the discus throw. She won a gold medal at the 2017 Summer Universiade and a bronze medal at the 2015 European U23 Championships.

Pudenz won the silver medal at the 2020 Summer Olympics and 2022 European Championships, where she set a personal best of 67.87 metres.

International competitions

References

1993 births
Living people
People from Herford
Sportspeople from Detmold (region)
German female discus throwers
Universiade gold medalists in athletics (track and field)
Universiade gold medalists for Germany
Medalists at the 2017 Summer Universiade
World Athletics Championships athletes for Germany
German national athletics champions
Athletes (track and field) at the 2020 Summer Olympics
Medalists at the 2020 Summer Olympics
Olympic silver medalists in athletics (track and field)
Olympic silver medalists for Germany
Olympic athletes of Germany
European Athletics Championships medalists